Matt Coyle is an American author of crime fiction, best known for his Rick Cahill mystery series.

Biography 
Coyle received a Bachelor of Arts degree in English from the University of California, Santa Barbara. He presently lives in San Diego.

Awards

Publications

Rick Cahill series 

 Yesterday’s Echo (2013)
 Night Tremors (2015)
 Dark Fissures (2016)
 Blood Truth (2017)
 Wrong Light (2018)
 Lost Tomorrows (2019)
 Blind Vigil (2020)
 Last Redemption (2021)
 Doomed Legacy (2022)
 Odyssey’s End (expected 2023)

References

External links 

 Official website

21st-century American writers
Writers from California
Year of birth missing (living people)
Living people
University of California, Santa Barbara alumni